Aldanella is an extinct paleozoic mollusc that was assigned to the Gastropod stem group but may also belong to a paraphyletic "Monoplacophora".

References

Paleozoic life of Newfoundland and Labrador
Paleozoic life of Nova Scotia
Prehistoric molluscs of Europe
Prehistoric molluscs of North America